Cho Hun can refer to:

 Cho Hun (gymnast, born 1958), North Korean gymnast
 Cho Hun (gymnast, born 1968), North Korean gymnast